Andrej Pohar (born 18 July 1974) is a Slovenian former badminton player from Olimpija club.

He was the coach on the 2000 Olympics expedition in Sydney, Australia. His sister Maja Pohar was also a professional badminton player, and the duo played in the mixed doubles event. Pohar won his first National championship in 1992 after five junior titles in Slovenia. He is the multiple National champion, having won National Championships for 33 times in 3 disciplines. Internationally, he was successful in Slovakia and Hungary, among others. He took part in the World Championships between 1995 and 2006 in various disciplines. He reached top 20 in IBF rankings in mixed doubles. At present, he is the member of Board of Directors in Badminton Europe.

Achievements

IBF International 
Men's singles

Men's doubles

Mixed doubles

References 

1974 births
Living people
Slovenian male badminton players
21st-century Slovenian people